The golden-crowned warbler (Basileuterus culicivorus) is a small New World warbler.

Distribution and habitat
It breeds from Mexico and south through Central America to northeastern Argentina and Uruguay, and on Trinidad. It is mainly a species of lowland forests.

Description
It has grey-green upperparts and bright yellow underparts. The head is grey with a black-bordered yellow crown stripe, a yellow or white supercilium and a black eyestripe. Sexes are similar, but the immature golden-crowned warbler is duller, browner and lacks the head pattern other than the eyestripe.

Taxonomy
Golden-crowned warbler has 13 geographical races, which fall into three groups. The Central American culicivorus group (known as the stripe-crowned warbler) is essentially as described above, the southwestern cabanisi group (known as Cabanis's warbler) has grey upperparts and a white supercilium, and the aureocapillus group (known as the golden-crowned warbler) of the southeast, which has a white supercilium and orange-rufous crown stripe. The three groups are sometimes considered to be different species.

Behaviour
These birds feed on insects and spiders. The song is a high thin pit-seet-seet-seet-seet, and the call is a sharp tsip. It lays two to four rufous-spotted white eggs in a domed nest in a bank, often by a forest path, or under leaves on the forest floor. Parent birds will feign injury to distract potential nest predators.

References

External links

 
 

golden-crowned warbler
Birds of Central America
Birds of South America
golden-crowned warbler
golden-crowned warbler